

Distribution 
It grows in dry, subarid and subhumid bioclimates, on the West coast in the provinces of Toliara (Tuléar), Mahajanga and Antsiranana (Diego Suarez) in altitudes from 0–900 m.
It grows as bushlike tree with a diameter of 0.2 to 1.5 m, reaching a height of 2–9 m. 
Leave size is 12–20 cm x 6–8 cm.

Uses 
Its stem bark and leaves are used for the production of essential oil that is used in traditional medicine to relieve malaria, fever and muscular fatigue

Its wood is used for construction purposes.

Ecology

Cedrelopsis grevei is considered being of Least concern (LC).

Synonyms 
 Katafa crassisepalum Costantin & Poiss.

References
 Hist. Phys. Madagascar 34(4): , atlas 2, t. 25,1893

grevei
Endemic flora of Madagascar
Flora of the Madagascar dry deciduous forests
Flora of the Madagascar spiny thickets
Flora of the Madagascar subhumid forests
Flora of the Madagascar succulent woodlands
Trees of Madagascar
Taxa named by Henri Ernest Baillon
Taxa named by Lucien Désiré Joseph Courchet
Least concern biota of Africa